Riccardo Mastrangeli (born 20 July 1960) is an Italian politician, Mayor of Frosinone since 2022.

Biography 
Mastrangeli graduated in pharmacy at the Sapienza University of Rome.

He joined Forza Italia in 1994 and was elected to the Chamber of Deputies at the 1994 election

In 1998 he was elected for the first time to the municipal council of Frosinone, while since 2012 he has been councilor for finances and budget. At the 2022 Italian local elections he is the official candidate of the centre-right coalition for the office of mayor of Frosinone. After obtaining 49.26% in the first round, he enters the ballot against the centre-left candidate and former mayor Domenico Marzi and is elected mayor with 55.32% of the votes.

References 

Living people
1960 births
People from Rome
Sapienza University of Rome alumni
Forza Italia politicians
Forza Italia (2013) politicians
The People of Freedom politicians
21st-century Italian politicians
Mayors of Frosinone